Ma Pau Stars Sports Club is a football club from Trinidad and Tobago that began playing in the TT Pro League in 2016.

 
Football clubs in Trinidad and Tobago
2007 establishments in Trinidad and Tobago
2011 disestablishments in Trinidad and Tobago
Association football clubs established in 2007
Association football clubs disestablished in 2011